The 1965–66 DFB-Pokal was the 23rd season of the annual German football cup competition. It began on 22 January 1966 and ended on 4 June 1966. 32 teams competed in the tournament of five rounds. In the final Bayern Munich defeated Meidericher SV 4–2.

Matches

Qualification round

First round

Replay

Round of 16

Quarter-finals

Semi-finals

Final

References

External links
 Official site of the DFB 
 Kicker.de 
 1966 results at Fussballdaten.de 
 1966 results at Weltfussball.de 

1965-66
1965–66 in German football cups